Nantanit Konchan (born 5 September 1986) is a Thai woman cricketer. She made her international debut at the 2009 ACC Women's Twenty20 Championship and also played for Thailand in the 2011 ACC Women's Twenty20 Championship.

She was also the member of the national team at the 2013 ICC Women's World Twenty20 Qualifier.

References

External links 
 
Profile at CricHQ

1986 births
Living people
Nantanit Konchan
Cricketers at the 2010 Asian Games
Nantanit Konchan